The Lincolnshire Coast Light Railway is a  narrow gauge heritage railway built in 1960 using equipment from the Nocton Potato Estate railway. It was originally located at Humberston, near Cleethorpes, and operated until 1985. The equipment was removed from storage and used to create a new railway at Skegness which opened on 3 May 2009.

History
The railway was built by a group of railway enthusiasts who wished to preserve the stock and atmosphere of the Lincolnshire area potato railways. The land for the railway was leased from Grimsby Rural District Council and opened on 27 August 1960 using a Motor Rail "Simplex" locomotive and a single open bogie carriage. In 1961, a second Motor Rail locomotive was added, and the railway's first steam locomotive Jurassic arrived. Additional equipment in the form of a passenger coach from the Sand Hutton Light Railway (closed to passengers in 1930) and two vehicles that had formerly run on the Ashover Light Railway were brought to the railway and restored, entering service in 1967 and 1962-3 respectively. Midweek carryings were adversely affected by the 1962 extension of Grimsby-Cleethorpes Transport bus service to serve the Fitties holiday camp, but weekend and Bank Holiday traffic remained strong, and by 1964 the line was carrying 60,000 passengers a year.

In 1966, the railway was rebuilt on a new alignment and extended. The line saw considerable success in the late 1960s, and another steam locomotive, Elin,  arrived, although it was too heavy for the lightly laid track which limited axle loadings to approximately 2.5 tonnes. Trains operated push-pull for many years, but an accident resulted in the Railway Inspectorate requiring the installation of run-round loops, so that the locomotive would always be at the head of the train, and air brakes.

The railway also became home to a number of ex-Great Northern Railway items including the somersault signals used to control movements at North Sea Lane station, railings, and other platform furniture from stations on the East Lincolnshire Railway many of whose minor stations were closed in 1963.

In the early 1980s, the railway carried heavy passenger traffic to and from a large car boot sale held at Humberston Fitties on Sundays.  Traffic was so heavy that at times all three covered carriages were in use simultaneously. However, midweek traffic outside of the brief summer season had dwindled to almost nothing. Other issues arose that made it impractical to continue on the Humberston site. Firstly, the 1984 miners' strike considerably reduced the number of holiday makers using the Fitties holiday camp, further decreasing traffic on the line.  Also, as a condition of renewing the lease on the site, the council insisted on the installation of  fences on both sides of the railway, which would have created an unpleasant cage-like environment for passengers using the railway's low-slung coaches. In 1985, faced with a series of obstacles, the railway closed at the end of the summer season in September, and the track was lifted shortly afterwards.

The Lincolnshire Coast Light Railway Historic Vehicles Trust was formed in 1983 with the intention of restoring and preserving some of the ex-Nocton Great War era vehicles that were to be disposed of by the LCLR Company. Certain items, including a World War I Ambulance Van, were lent to the Museum of Army Transport at Beverley, until that ran into financial difficulties in the mid-1990s. The trusts' stock was moved to a private site until it was re-united with the rest of the railway at the Water Leisure Park.

After the line closed at the end of its 1985 season, Jurassic was still in ticket for a year, so it was taken to the Leighton Buzzard Narrow Gauge Railway to run in their gala, where it attracted much attention and reminded visitors that the LCLR was still in existence. After its return to Humberston, the track was lifted and all the rolling stock, rails and equipment went into storage on land adjacent to the site of the former Burgh-le-Marsh railway station (closed 1970). Eventually the LCLR was offered a new home in the early 1990s in the Skegness Water Leisure Park, then under development and was moved there, enabling volunteers to begin relaying the track. The line was reopened in 2009

In 2014, a bid was made by the trust to re-build the open coach, converted in 1962 from one of the ex Nocton Class D wagons, into a disabled-friendly passenger vehicle. After winning a vote in the 'Peoples Millions' competition run by ITV, the Trust was awarded £43,400 to do the work, and the project was completed by the end of 2015. The 'D' class bogie wagon has been returned to its original appearance, apart from the addition of a safety rail above the sides and ends of the vehicle and the inclusion of a small door in one of the drop sides of the wagon for the loading and unloading of passengers and wheelchairs.  Seating is provided in the form of boxes resembling World War I ammunition boxes secured around the sides of the vehicle. The platform at Wall's Lane (former Lakeview) station has been extended and upgraded to accommodate a two-coach train and provide disabled access to the trains. A water tank has been installed to cater for the return of Jurassic to traffic.

The Trust restored the Peckett Jurassic with a "Back to Steam" appeal, with the locomotive tested "in steam" (minus air brakes) in August 2017. It entered service, fully equipped with air brakes, in September 2017.

Locomotives

References

Bibliography

Further reading

External links

2 ft gauge railways in England
Heritage railways in Lincolnshire
Railway lines opened in 1960
Railway lines closed in 1985
Railway lines opened in 2009